The New Zealand national cricket team toured India and played three Test matches and five ODIs between 4 November and 10 December 2010.

Squads

Test series

1st Test

2nd Test

3rd Test

ODI series

1st ODI

2nd ODI

3rd ODI

4th ODI

5th ODI

References

External links

2010 in Indian cricket
2010 in New Zealand cricket
Indian cricket seasons from 2000–01
International cricket competitions in 2010–11
2010-11